Troms is a former county in northern Norway. On 1 January 2020 it was merged with the neighboring Finnmark county to create the new Troms og Finnmark county. This merger is expected to be reversed by the government resulting from the 2021 Norwegian parliamentary election.

It bordered Finnmark county to the northeast and Nordland county in the southwest. Norrbotten Län in Sweden is located to the south and further southeast is a shorter border with Lapland Province in Finland. To the west is the Norwegian Sea (Atlantic Ocean).

The entire county, which was established in 1866, was located north of the Arctic Circle. The Troms County Municipality was the governing body for the county, elected by the people of Troms, while the Troms county governor was a representative of the King and Government of Norway. The county had a population of 161,771 in 2014.

General information

Name
Until 1919, the county was formerly known as Tromsø amt. On 1 July 2006, the Northern Sami name for the county, Romsa, was granted official status along with Troms.

The county (and the city of Tromsø) was named after the island Tromsøya on which it was located (Old Norse Trums). Several theories exist as to the etymology of Troms. One theory holds "Troms-" to derive from the old (uncompounded) name of the island (Old Norse: Trums). Several islands and rivers in Norway have the name Tromsa, and the names of these are probably derived from the word straumr which means "(strong) stream". (The original form must then have been Strums, for the missing s see Indo-European s-mobile.) Another theory holds that Tromsøya was originally called Lille Tromsøya (Little Tromsøya), because of its proximity to the much bigger island today called Kvaløya, that according to this theory was earlier called "Store Tromsøya" due to a characteristic mountain known as Tromma (the Drum). The mountain's name in Sámi, Rumbbučohkka, is identical in meaning, and it is said to have been a sacred mountain for the Sámi in pre-Christian times.

The Sámi name of the island, Romsa, is assumed to be a loan from Norse – but according to the phonetical rules of the Sami language the frontal t has disappeared from the name.  However, an alternative form – Tromsa – is in informal use. There is a theory that holds the Norwegian name of Tromsø derives from the Sámi name, though this theory lacks an explanation for the meaning of Romsa. A common misunderstanding is that Tromsø's Sámi name is Romssa with a double "s". This, however, is the accusative and genitive form of the noun used when, for example, writing "Tromsø Municipality" (Romssa Suohkan).

Coat of arms
The coat of arms of Troms was made by Hallvard Trætteberg (1898–1987) and adopted by royal resolution on 15 January 1960. The official blazon in Norwegian ("På rød bunn en gull griff") translates to "On a field Gules a griffin [segreant] Or." Trætteberg chose to have the griffin as charge because that animal was the symbol of the mighty clan of Bjarne Erlingsson on Bjarkøy in the 13th century.

Geography

Troms, when it existed, was located in the northern part of the Scandinavian peninsula. Due to the long distance to the more densely populated areas of the continent, this is one of the least polluted areas of Europe. Troms has a very rugged and indented coastline facing the Norwegian Sea. However, the large and mountainous islands along the coast provide an excellent sheltered waterway on the inside. Starting in the south, the largest islands are: northeastern part of Hinnøya (the southern part is in Nordland), Grytøya, Senja, Kvaløya, Ringvassøya, Reinøy, Vanna, and Arnøy. Some of these islands, most noteworthy Senja, have a rugged outer coast with steep mountains, and a more calm eastern shore. There are several large fjords that stretch quite far inland. Starting in the south, the largest fjords are Vågsfjorden, Andfjorden (shared with Nordland), Malangen, Balsfjord, Ullsfjord, Lyngen, and Kvænangen (fjord). The largest lake is Altevatnet in the interior of the county.

Several glaciers are located in Kvænangen, including parts of the Øksfjordjøkelen, the last glacier in mainland Norway to drop icebergs directly into the sea (in the Jøkelfjord). Marble is present in parts of Troms, and thus numerous caves, as in Salangen and Skånland.

Climate

The all-time high for Troms is  recorded in Bardufoss July 18, 2018. Thaws can occur even in mid-winter. There was often snow in abundance, and avalanches were not uncommon in winter. With the prevailing westerlies, lowland areas east of mountain ranges have less precipitation than areas west of the mountains.

Skibotn in Storfjord is the location in Norway which has recorded the most days per year with clear skies (no clouds).

Sunlight
The aurora borealis is a common sight in the whole of the former Troms, but not in summer as there is no darkness. As with all areas in the polar latitudes, there are extreme variations in daylight between the seasons. As a consequence of this, the length of daylight increases (late winter and spring) or decreases (autumn) by 10 minutes from one day to the next.

Nature

Moose, red fox, hare, stoat, and small rodents are common in all of Troms county. Brown bears are sighted in the interior parts of the county in the summer. Other animals that can be seen are reindeer (interior mountain areas, with Sami owners), wolverine (interior mountain areas), Eurasian otters (along the coast and rivers), Eurasian lynx (in the forests), and harbour porpoises in the fjords. Sperm whales, killer whales and humpback whales are often seen in Andfjorden. Some of the common birds are ptarmigan, sea eagles, European herring gulls, and great cormorants.

Rowan, aspen, willow, grey alder, and bird cherry are common in the lower elevations.

Scots pine reaches an elevation of almost  in Dividalen, where some of the largest trees are 500 years old. The upper part of the valley is protected by Øvre Dividal National Park, which was enlarged in 2006. In 2011, the Rohkunborri National Park was established in Bardu municipality, bordering Sweden and only a few kilometers south of Øvre Dividal National Park.

The inland valleys, like Østerdalen (with Altevatnet), Kirkesdalen, Dividalen, Rostadalen, Signaldalen, and Skibotndalen, are perfect for summer hiking, with their varied nature, mostly dry climate and not too difficult terrain, although there are many accessible mountains for energetic hikers.

Reisadalen is one of the most idyllic river valleys in Norway; from Storslett in Nordreisa the valley stretches south-southeast, covered with birch, pine, grey alder, and willow. The salmon swim  up the river, and some 137 different species of birds have been observed. Reisa National Park protects the upper part of the valley.

Economy

The city of Tromsø, in the north central part, was the county seat and an Arctic seaport, and seat of the world's northernmost university, renowned for research about the aurora borealis. The University of Tromsø has an astrophysical observatory located in Skibotn. Tromsø was the only municipality in the former county with a strong population growth; most of the smaller municipalities experience decreasing populations as the young and educated moved to the cities, often in the southern part of Norway. Harstad is a commercial centre for the southern part of the former county, and has been chosen by Statoil as its main office in Northern Norway.

Along the coast and on the islands, fishing is dominant. Important ports for the fishing fleet are Skjervøy, Tromsø and Harstad. There is also some agriculture, especially in the southern part of the former county, which has a longer growing season (150 days in Harstad). Balsfjord is often regarded to be the most northern municipality with substantial agricultural activity in Norway, although there is also agriculture further north.

The Norwegian armed forces were vital employers in the former Troms, having the seat of the 6th army division, Bardufoss Air Station, helicopter wings and radar stations in the county. There are hospitals in Tromsø (university hospital and main hospital for North Norway) and Harstad.

While the busiest airport in the former Troms is Tromsø Airport, the southern part included Harstad/Narvik Airport, Evenes and Bardufoss Airport, with Sørkjosen Airport in the northeast. The E6 cuts through the county from Nordland into Gratangen in the south to Kvænangen in the north and then into Finnmark. The E8 road runs from Tromsø to Finland via Nordkjosbotn and the Skibotn valley. There are several large bridges; some of the largest are Tjeldsund Bridge, Mjøsund Bridge, Gisund Bridge, Tromsø Bridge and Sandnessund Bridge. There are several undersea road tunnels; Rolla to Andørja (in Ibestad), Tromsøya to the mainland (Tromsø), Kvaløya to Ringvassøya and Skjervøy to the mainland. The roads are well maintained, but have to go long detours around fjords. For this reason passenger boats are fairly popular, for example between Tromsø and Harstad, and there are also commercial flights inside the former county of Troms.

There was no railway in Troms, but in 2013, the government of Finland expressed interest in building a railway from the Finnish rail network to port facilities at Skibotn, though they also stated that they could not finance much of the cost.

History

{{Historical populations
|footnote = Source: Statistics Norway.
|shading = off
|1951|117564
|1961|127771
|1971|136805
|1981|146818
|1991|146816
|2001|151777
|2011|157554
|2021?|168953
|2031?|176342
}}
Troms has been settled since the early Stone Age, and there are prehistoric rock carvings at several locations (for instance Ibestad and Balsfjord). These people made their living from hunting, fishing and gathering.

The first of the current ethnic groups to settle in the county were the Sami people, who inhabited Sápmi, an area much larger than today's Nordland, Troms and Finnmark counties. Archeological evidence has shown that a Norse iron-based culture in the late Roman Iron Age (200–400 AD), reaches as far north as Karlsøy (near today's Tromsø), but not further northeast.

The Norse with their iron and agriculture settled along the coast and in some of the larger fjords, while the Sami lived in the same fjord areas, usually just into the fjord and in the interior. From the 10th century, Norse settlements start to appear along the coast further north, reaching into what is today the county of Finnmark.

Southern and mid-Troms was a petty kingdom in the Viking Age, and considered part of Hålogaland. Ottar from Hålogaland met King Alfred the Great around 890. The Viking leader Tore Hund had his seat at Bjarkøy. According to the sagas, Tore Hund speared King Olav Haraldsson at the Battle of Stiklestad. He also traded and fought in Bjarmaland, today the area of Arkhangelsk in northern Russia . Trondenes (today's Harstad) was also a central Viking power centre, and seems to have been a gathering place.

Demographics

The Kven residents of Troms'' are largely descendants of Finnish immigrants who arrived in the area before the 19th century from Finland because of war and famine. They settled mainly in the northeastern part of Troms, in the municipalities of Kvænangen, Nordreisa, Skjervøy, Gáivuotna - Kåfjord and Storfjord, and some also reached Balsfjord and Lyngen.

Municipalities
Troms county had a total of 24 municipalities at dissolution.

Photo gallery

Notable people
Samuel Georg Simeon Wennberg, member of parliament

See also
Hålogalandsallmenningen

References

Other sources

External links

Visitnorway.com Troms
Troms touring association

 
Former counties of Norway
History of Troms og Finnmark
Populated places disestablished in 2020
2020 disestablishments in Norway
States and territories disestablished in 2020